Going For Gold is a singles compilation album by the British rock band Shed Seven, released in May 1999 via Polydor Records.  The album features sleevenotes written by Mark Sutherland, the former editor of Melody Maker, who refers to the LP as the band's "Best of Album", whereas the album artwork itself carries the sub-title The Greatest Hits.

Background
As well as compiling the band's singles from 1994 to 1998, Going For Gold featured newly recorded versions of two previous releases, "Dolphin" and "Ocean Pie", alongside brand new material in "Disco Down" and "High Hopes".  "Disco Down" went on to become the last Banks-era hit for the band when issued as the album's lead single, two weeks prior to its release, whereas the follow-up single, "High Hopes", was never issued.

Like "Disco Down", the song was initially included in the album's track listing with the intention for it to be issued as a single, but was sidelined post-album release by the band's record label in favour of a proposed re-issue of their 1996 single, "Going For Gold". Following the band's refusal to comply, Shed Seven and Polydor Records parted company in late 1999, as "High Hopes" became the only track featured on the compilation which was not a 'hit' single, and Going For Gold became the band's final album release during their time with the label.

A limited edition 2-CD set was issued at the same time as the regular album and featured a bonus disc of four newly recorded session tracks – one song from each of their four studio albums to date (including Going For Gold itself) – two cover versions and a previously unreleased demo.  To coincide with the release of the album, the band went on an 8-date 'Greatest Hits' tour of the UK, beginning at Bristol University on 12 May and ending in a hometown gig at York's Barbican Centre on 4 June.

Critical reception

Going For Gold received mixed reviews upon release.  John Harris of Select felt that the album proved that the band have "always been blessed with the knack of creating admirably tidy, creditably catchy pop music" in his complimentary review, whilst AllMusic's Jason Damas labelled it "an excellent compilation of radio-ready rock & roll from one of the best singles bands of the 1990s". Howard Johnson of Q gave praise to the band's "epic sweep", but found fault with Witter's vocals, noting that;

|NME'''s Victoria Segal, however, was less impressed with the LP, stating that the album "is a flooded engine of a record". Caroline Sullivan of The Guardian surmised that Going For Gold showed Shed Seven's "real talent" to be "persistence" and thought that the album lacked diversity; "Few of the tracks diverge from the doggedly catchy guitar rockin' model set by their first hit, Dolphin".

Chart performance

AlbumGoing For Gold sold 130,000 copies in the UK, spending a total of four weeks on the UK album chart, peaking at number 7 on 12 June 1999.

Single
"Disco Down" was the one and only new single taken from the compilation and was the band's final single release from their six years with Polydor Records.  It was released on 24 May 1999 and went on to spend a total of four weeks on the UK Singles Chart, peaking at number 13 on 5 June.

Track listing
All songs written by Shed Seven, unless otherwise stated.

Track 4 is an alternate mix to the single version, reworked by Stephen Street.
Track 5 is an alternate mix to the single version, reworked by Chris Sheldon.
Tracks 8 and 13 are 1999 re-recordings

Track 5 is a cover version of the 1981 Cliff Richard single.
Track 6 is an unreleased demo from the Let It Ride album sessions.
Track 7 was recorded live at London's Riverside Studios for TFI Friday'' and was previously released as a b-side on the band's 1996 single, "On Standby".  The song is a cover version of The Rolling Stones' 1968 UK Chart No. 1 single.

20th Anniversary Gold Vinyl edition

Released 18 October 2019

Personnel

Shed Seven
Rick Witter – vocals
Paul Banks – guitar, keyboards on 1994 – 1998 recordings
Tom Gladwin – bass
Alan Leach – drums

Additional musicians
Fraser Smith – keyboards on 1999 recordings
Clint Boon – keyboards on She Left Me on Friday and additional keyboards on The Heroes

References

External links

Going for Gold at YouTube (streamed copy where licensed)

Shed Seven albums
1999 compilation albums
Polydor Records compilation albums